General Brewster may refer to:

Andre W. Brewster (1862–1942), Major General in the United States Army
 , a ship named for the general
William R. Brewster (1828–1869), American Civil War general

See also
 Attorney General Brewster (disambiguation)